Mike Haviland (born July 24, 1967) is the former head coach for the Colorado College Tigers of the NCHC from 2014 to 2021. Previously he was head coach of the Hershey Bears of the American Hockey League. Previously, he was an assistant coach for the Chicago Blackhawks of the National Hockey League from 2008–2012, where he won the Stanley Cup in 2010.

Haviland was named the American Hockey League's Coach of Year, winning the Louis A. R. Pieri Memorial Award for the 2006–07 AHL season, while serving as head coach of the Norfolk Admirals.

On June 18, 2013 it was announced that Haviland would take over as head coach of the Bears, replacing Mark French.

On May 9, 2014 Haviland was named Head Coach of the Colorado College Tigers replacing Scott Owens.

Head coaching record

References

External links

1967 births
American Hockey League coaches
Binghamton Whalers players
Chicago Blackhawks coaches
Living people
National Hockey League supplemental draft picks
New Jersey Devils draft picks
Richmond Renegades players
Stanley Cup champions
Winston-Salem Thunderbirds players
Hershey Bears coaches
American men's ice hockey forwards